Tyson Ngo (born May 5, 2001), better known as TenZ, is a Canadian professional Valorant player, streamer and former Counter-Strike: Global Offensive player currently signed to Sentinels.

Career
Ngo's professional career began in October 2019 when he joined Cloud9's Counter-Strike: Global Offensive team at the age of 18, making him one of the youngest players in the professional scene at the time. In April 2020, following the public beta release of Riot Games' first-person shooter Valorant, Ngo announced his intention to retire from CS:GO and transition into the new game, making him Cloud9's first professional Valorant player.

On January 12, 2021, Ngo announced that he would be stepping down from professional Valorant in order to pursue content creation.

Following the suspension of Sentinels player Sinatraa due to sexual assault allegations, Cloud9 agreed to loan Ngo to Sentinels in April 2021, marking his return to professional Valorant after a three month absence. The following month, Sentinels went on to defeat Fnatic at the Grand Finals of VCT Masters 2 in Reykjavík, winning the first ever international LAN tournament in Valorant history. On June 2, 2021, Sentinels bought out Ngo's contract in a seven figure deal reportedly worth between $1.25 to $1.5 million.

Personal life
Ngo is in a relationship with 100 Thieves content creator Kyedae "Kyedae" Shymko. In August 2022, the couple announced their engagement.

Ngo is from Vancouver Island, and of Vietnamese and French descent.

Awards and nominations

References

2001 births
Living people
Canadian esports players
Cloud9 (esports) players
Twitch (service) streamers
Canadian people of Vietnamese descent
Canadian people of French descent
People from Vancouver Island